The Europe/Africa Zone was one of the three zones of the regional Davis Cup competition in 2001.

In the Europe/Africa Zone there were four different tiers, called groups, in which teams competed against each other to advance to the upper tier. The top two teams in each Group IV sub-zone advanced to the Europe/Africa Zone Group III in 2002. All other teams remained in Group IV.

Participating nations

Draw
 Venue: Nicosia Tennis Club, Nicosia, Cyprus
 Date: 16–20 May

Group A

Group B

  and  promoted to Group III in 2002.

Group A

Benin vs. Sudan

Cyprus vs. Algeria

Lesotho vs. Rwanda

Benin vs. Cyprus

Lesotho vs. Algeria

Rwanda vs. Sudan

Benin vs. Rwanda

Cyprus vs. Lesotho

Algeria vs. Sudan

Benin vs. Algeria

Cyprus vs. Rwanda

Lesotho vs. Sudan

Benin vs. Lesotho

Cyprus vs. Sudan

Rwanda vs. Algeria

Group B

Tunisia vs. Azerbaijan

San Marino vs. Gabon

Uganda vs. Burkina Faso

Tunisia vs. San Marino

Uganda vs. Gabon

Burkina Faso vs. Azerbaijan

Tunisia vs. Burkina Faso

San Marino vs. Uganda

Gabon vs. Azerbaijan

Tunisia vs. Gabon

San Marino vs. Burkina Faso

Uganda vs. Azerbaijan

Tunisia vs. Uganda

San Marino vs. Azerbaijan

Burkina Faso vs. Gabon

References

External links
Davis Cup official website

Davis Cup Europe/Africa Zone
Europe Africa Zone Group IV